Anthony Chesley (born May 31, 1996) is an American football cornerback for the Tampa Bay Buccaneers of the National Football League (NFL). He played college football at Coastal Carolina.

College career
Chesley played college football at Coastal Carolina from 2014 to 2018.

Professional career

Cincinnati Bengals
Chesley signed with the Cincinnati Bengals as an undrafted free agent on May 10, 2019. He was waived during final roster cuts on August 31, 2019, and signed to the practice squad the next day. He was released on October 24, 2019.

Houston Texans
Chesley signed with the Houston Texans' practice squad on October 29, 2019. He signed a reserve/future contract with the team following the season on January 13, 2020. He was waived during final roster cuts on September 5, 2020, and re-signed to the practice squad two days later. Chesley was elevated to the active roster on December 12, December 19, and December 27 for the team's weeks 14, 15, and 16 games against the Chicago Bears, Indianapolis Colts, and Cincinnati Bengals, and reverted to the practice squad after each game. His practice squad contract with the team expired after the season on January 11, 2021.

Indianapolis Colts
On January 12, 2021, Chesley signed a reserve/futures contract with the Indianapolis Colts. He was waived on August 31, 2021, and re-signed to the practice squad the next day. He was promoted to the active roster on September 29, 2021. He was waived on November 20 and re-signed to the practice squad. He signed a reserve/future contract on January 10, 2022.

On August 30, 2022, Chesley was waived by the Colts.

Tampa Bay Buccaneers
On September 1, 2022, Chesley was signed to the Tampa Bay Buccaneers practice squad. He was promoted to the active roster on December 14.

References

External links
 Houston Texans bio

1995 births
Living people
American football cornerbacks
People from Temple Hills, Maryland
Players of American football from Maryland
Coastal Carolina Chanticleers football players
Houston Texans players
Indianapolis Colts players
Tampa Bay Buccaneers players